The pygmy sunbird (Hedydipna platura) is a species of bird in the family Nectariniidae.
It is found in Benin, Burkina Faso, Cameroon, Central African Republic, Chad, Democratic Republic of the Congo, Ivory Coast, Ethiopia, Gambia, Ghana, Guinea, Guinea-Bissau, Kenya, Mali, Mauritania, Niger, Nigeria, Senegal, Sierra Leone, Sudan, Togo, and Uganda.

References

pygmy sunbird
Birds of Sub-Saharan Africa
Birds of West Africa
pygmy sunbird
Taxa named by Louis Jean Pierre Vieillot
Taxonomy articles created by Polbot